Flori sacre is the title of a 1912 collection of poetry by Romanian poet Alexandru Macedonski.  This collection, first issued by Revista Critică,  contains the following poems:
Avatar
Noaptea de decembrie
Mai
Imn la Satan
Castelul
Vasul
Corabia
Mănăstirea
Cântecul ploaiei
Rimele cântă pe harpă
Dor zadarnic
Lui Cetalo Pol
Lewki
Năluca unei nopţi
O umbră de dincolo de Styx
Oh! suflet orb
Perihelie

References

1912 poems
Alexandru Macedonski
Romanian poetry